SS Bandırma  was an Ottoman mixed-freight ship, which became famous for her historical role in taking Mustafa Kemal Pasha (Atatürk) from Constantinople (today-Istanbul) to Samsun in May 1919 that marked the establishment of the Turkish national movement.

The ship
The steamer Bandırma, built 1878 in Paisley, Scotland, was a  cargo ship with 192 gross register tons capacity. It was christened Trocadero, and under this name, it sailed five years long as a freighter for Dansey and Robinson. In 1883, it was purchased by Greek ship-owner H. Psicha Preaus, and renamed SS Kymi. 7 years later, it was sold to another Greek ship-owner, Cap. Andreadis, sailing under the same name. In 1891, it went down following an accident but could be floated again.

The Ottoman Maritime Co. purchased the ship in 1894, renamed it SS Panderma. It served in the Sea of Marmara as a passenger-cargo vessel. On 28 October 1910, the company's status was changed, and it was renamed Ottoman Transportation Authority. The ship’s name was also changed to SS Bandırma, Turkish for Panderma, and it served then as a mail ship in the coastal waters of Ottoman Empire.

During World War I, SS Bandırma collided with the British submarine , and survived a torpedo attack from the same vessel. Bandırma was taken out of duty in 1924. It was sold 1925, and demolished in a shipyard in Golden Horn within four months.

The mission
It went into the history of Republic of Turkey, when Mustafa Kemal Pasha, who was appointed shortly before Inspector of the Ninth Army Troops Inspectorate of the Ottoman Empire in eastern Anatolia, left Constantinople with SS Bandırma on 16 May 1919 for Samsun. He was sent to Anatolia by sultan's decree to oversee the process of disbanding the Ottoman Army that was ordered by the Entente powers occupying the capital and controlling the Ottoman government.

Mustafa Kemal Pasha, accompanied with 22 officers, 25 soldiers, and 8 administrative staff sailed in heavy weather on the old steamer with a not functioning compass needed to navigate in the wavy Black Sea, and set foot on land in Samsun on 19 May 1919. Upon landing, Mustafa Kemal Pasha started the Turkish national movement contrary to the orders given to him by the Ottoman government in İstanbul that resulted in the declaration of the Republic of Turkey after the Turkish War of Independence almost four years later.

The replica
In view of its important historical role in the birth of the Republic of Turkey, the governor and the mayor of Samsun Province both initiated the rebuilding of Bandırma in original dimensions and outlook. The building of the replica by Taşkınlar Shipbuilding Co. started on 9 May 2000, and was completed on 15 April 2001. The new Bandırma was opened as a museum ship by Prime Minister Recep Tayyip Erdoğan on 19 May 2003 at Doğu Park (East Park) in Samsun. Wax figures of Mustafa Kemal Pasha and his followers on the ship are on display along with historical items in the museum ship today.

Ship's register

 1878 SS Trocadero, Great Britain, Dansey and Robinson
 1883 SS Kymi, Greece, H. Psicha Preus
 1890 SS Kymi, Greece, Cap. Andreadis
 1894 SS Panderma, Ottoman Empire, Ottoman Maritime Co.
 1910 SS Bandırma, Ottoman Empire, Ottoman Transportation Co.
 1924 taken out of service
 1925 demolished
 2001 replica built
 2003 replica put in service as museum ship in Samsun

References

 Municipality of Samsun website
 Samsun
 SS Bandırma

External links

Ships built on the River Clyde
Cargo ships of the United Kingdom
Cargo ships of the Ottoman Empire
Mustafa Kemal Atatürk
Replica ships
1878 ships
Museum ships in Turkey
Tourist attractions in Samsun